Alanna Goldie (born April 17, 1994) is a Canadian Olympic fencer.

She participated in the 2010 Youth Olympics where she came fourth in the individual foil event and won a bronze medal in the mixed NOC team.

Her first senior international competition was the 2011 Pan American  Games where she won a silver medal in the team foil event. She also participated in the 2015 Pan American Games where she won a gold medal in the team foil event and a bronze medal in the individual foil event. She won a silver medal at the 2019 Pan American Games in the team event.
She went on to compete at the Tokyo 2020 Olympics finishing 5th in the Women's Foil Team Event.

She has also participated in the Pan American Fencing Championships where she won silver medals in the foil team event every year from 2011 to 2018 and bronze medals in the individual foil event in 2012, 2013 and 2016.

References

External links 
 Alanna Goldie at the 2019 Pan American Games

1994 births
Living people
Canadian female fencers
Fencers at the 2010 Summer Youth Olympics
Pan American Games medalists in fencing
Pan American Games gold medalists for Canada
Pan American Games silver medalists for Canada
Pan American Games bronze medalists for Canada
Fencers at the 2011 Pan American Games
Fencers at the 2015 Pan American Games
Sportspeople from Calgary
Fencers at the 2019 Pan American Games
Medalists at the 2011 Pan American Games
Medalists at the 2015 Pan American Games
Medalists at the 2019 Pan American Games
Fencers at the 2020 Summer Olympics
Olympic fencers of Canada
Youth Olympic bronze medalists for Canada
21st-century Canadian women